Group A of the 2007 Fed Cup Americas Zone Group II was one of two pools in the Americas Zone Group II of the 2007 Fed Cup. Five teams competed in a round robin competition, with the teams proceeding to their respective sections of the play-offs: the top two teams played for advancement to the 2008 Group I.

Uruguay vs. Honduras

Ecuador vs. Bermuda

Uruguay vs. Ecuador

Bermuda vs. Honduras

Uruguay vs. Bermuda

Ecuador vs. Honduras

See also
Fed Cup structure

References

External links
 Fed Cup website

2007 Fed Cup Americas Zone